Sei Chokh is a Bengali romantic drama film directed by Salil Dutta based on a story on Bengali novelist Bimal Mitra. The film was released 30 July 1976 under the banner of Gitali Pictures. Nachiketa Ghosh was the music director of Sei Chokh.

Plot
Nabakrishna's uncle Prankrishna bring back him to their home from a mental home. Before that Nabakrishna lives like a free bird, always had his way with women and being kind hearted he always gifted them. He can not bear restrictions imposed by his uncle and aunts, he soon escapes with his servant Bipul. They don't have any place to stay hence Nabakrishna goes to Mrs. Nandi's home. Nita, Mrs. Nandi's niece is a simple girl who loved Amal against her aunts will, but Mrs. Nandi plans to separate them and fixes Nita's marriage with Nabakrishna. Hearing the news of the marriage another lady Malati rushes to cancel the marriage because she was Nabakrishna's ex lover. By this time Nita's lover Amal also returns.

Cast
 Uttam Kumar as Nabakrishna
 Utpal Dutt
 Sabitri Chatterjee
 Mahua Roychoudhury as Nita
 Sulata Chowdhury
 Chhaya Devi
 Jahor Roy
Dilip Roy
 Basabi Nandi
Partha Mukhopadhya as Amal
 Kalyani Adhikari
 Haradhan Bannerjee
 Moni Srimani
 Sailen Mukhopadhyay

Soundtrack 
Soundtrack was composed by Nachiketa Ghosh.

References

External links
 

Bengali-language Indian films
1976 films
1976 romantic drama films
Films based on Indian novels
Indian black-and-white films
Indian romantic drama films
1970s Bengali-language films
Films directed by Salil Dutta